MTN Irancell, also known as Irancell is an Iranian telecommunications company that operates Iran's largest 2G-3G-4G-4.5G-5G mobile network, and fixed wireless TD-LTE internet services. It is the first provider of 5G internet in Iran. As of 2013, Irancell holds a revenue of 4.9 billion dollars. It is the 32nd largest company in Iran. Currently, MTN Group holds a 49% percent stake in the Irancell consortium, while Kowsar Sign Paniz (KSP) holds the other 51% of shares.

On 3 December 2014, Irancell officially launched Iran's first 4G LTE network in nine cities. The License was granted as on a national basis and includes the overall geographical coverage of Iran.

Within a short time after being granted the license, Irancell was able to complete the network operation and roll-out and started the test launch of its network on 28 August 2006 (some 9 months after being granted the license). Irancell was officially launched on 21 October 2006 in Tehran, Tabriz, and Mashhad. The network provides the subscribers with an advanced generation of GSM system to enable them to get used of EDGE (2.75 G).

Irancell made countrywide coverage with FD-LTE and TD-LTE. As of December 2021, Irancell has 50.4 million active subscribers.

Shareholders
Irancell has two shareholders: Kowsar Sign Paniz (KSP) (51%), and MTN International (Mauritius) Limited (49%).

IEDC currently has two key shareholders:
 Mostazafan Foundation, a Bonyad
 Iran Electronics Industries (IEI), known as SAIRAN (company with military contracts)

Controversy

Sanctions 
According to Reuters, the company was able to obtain banned U.S. technologies despite imposed sanctions against Iran.

Sunni insult and boycott 
In July 2013, Iran's Sunni community which is the second-largest religious group, accused the company of insulting caliph Umar after he was called "deceived by the Devil" in a competition's question. People in predominantly Sunni Provinces Kurdistan and Sistan & Baluchestan boycotted the company and a Sunni MP voiced their anger in a parliamentary session. Irancell later apologized for the 'unintentional mistake'.

Mobile web pricing 
After Irancell doubled the prices for its mobile web services in December 2014, some angered users started protesting the company via the social media. Subscribers decided to hold a boycott on the company and remove their SIM cards altogether on 31 December 2014.

Subscribers' privacy leak 
Irancell has been criticized for its privacy policy. In July 2016, a robot known as MTN Bot leaked data on personal information of millions of Irancell subscribers on Telegram. Irancell did not pledge responsibility for the leakage and accused its rivals for the turmoil caused by the news. On 3 July 2016, Minister of Communications Mahmoud Vaezi told that the data was leaked by an intelligence agent when Irancell handed subscribers' data to an anonymous intelligence agency in Iran upon an inquiry in 2014.

Ad injection 
In November 2017, Minister of Communications Mohammad Javad Jahromi warned Irancell over its ad injection.

References

External links

Mobile phone companies of Iran
Privately held companies of Iran
Iranian companies established in 2005
Telecommunications companies established in 2005